Thulium(III) hydroxide is an inorganic compound with the chemical formula Tm(OH)3.

Chemical properties
Thulium(III) hydroxide reacts with acids and produces thulium(III) salts:
 Tm(OH)3 + 3 H+ → Tm3+ + 3 H2O
Thulium(III) hydroxide decomposes to TmO(OH) at elevated temperature. Further decomposition produces Tm2O3.

References

Thulium compounds
Hydroxides